Chen Qunqing (born March 22, 1983 in Chenghai, Shantou, Guangdong) is a female Chinese field hockey player who competed at the 2004 Summer Olympics in Athens, Greece. She finished fourth with the Chinese team in the women's competition, and played all six matches.

External links
 
 
 
 
 
 Athens 2004 profile at Yahoo Sports

1983 births
Living people
Field hockey players at the 2004 Summer Olympics
Olympic field hockey players of China
Chinese female field hockey players
People from Chenghai
Sportspeople from Guangdong
21st-century Chinese women